is a Japanese band formed in 2013. It consists of: Daiki Tsuneta (Vocalist & Guitarist), Satoru Iguchi (Vocalist & Keyboardist), Kazuki Arai (Bassist) and Yu Seki (Drummer). The band's main songwriter is Daiki Tsuneta, who also performs as part of the creative collective Millennium Parade.

Career
In 2013, Mrs.Vinci was formed, later going by Srv.Vinci.

In 2017, they renamed themselves to King Gnu. They then performed at the Fuji Rock Festival in 2017 and 2018.

In January 2019, the band released Sympa, their first release under a major label after signing to Ariola Japan. The following month, King Gnu released hit song "Hakujitsu", which ranked No.4 in the year-end chart of Billboard Japan Hot 100. In October, they released "Kasa" and achieved their first No.1 on the Billboard Japan Download Chart. Ceremony was a commercial success, peaking atop the Japanese Oricon albums chart, the Billboard Japan albums chart, and was one of the 10 best-selling albums of 2020 worldwide by selling over one million copies.

In December 2021, MAPPA released a few movie trailers promoting the Jujutsu Kaisen 0 (film) movie adaptation, which King Gnu have made 2 new songs for the film. The songs are "Ichizu" (一途, "The Only Way") and "Sakayume" (逆夢, "Contradictory Dream"), which are the opening and ending themes for the Jujutsu Kaisen movie. The two songs were released together as Ichizu/Sakayume. In March 2022, they released a new song called "Chameleon" (カメレオン, Kamereon), which is the theme for Japanese television drama Don't Call it Mystery, adapted from the manga of the same name.

Discography

Studio albums

Extended plays

Singles

Promotional singles

Other charted songs

Guest appearances

Kōhaku Uta Gassen appearances

Accolades

References

Japanese alternative rock groups
Musical groups established in 2013
2013 establishments in Japan
Musical quartets
MTV Europe Music Award winners